Paduka Sri Sultan Sir Abdul Hamid Halim Shah ibni Almarhum Sultan Ahmad Tajuddin Mukarram Shah  (4 June 1864 – 13 May 1943) was the 26th Sultan of Kedah. He reigned from 1881 to 1943.

Foreign relations
During his reign, the Sultan had asked for a $2,500,000 loan from Siam during a state financial crisis in 1905. The loan was extended with the proviso that a Financial Advisor from the court of Siam be accepted and a State Council be created to assist the Sultan in the administration of all public affairs. This resulted in the promulgation of a new constitution on 29 July 1905. The state council were run by his brothers followed by their sons. The formation of the State Council thus curbed the Sultan's administrative powers.

His reign marked the transition from Siamese suzerainty over Kedah to the British Protectorate of Unfederated Malay States following the Anglo-Siamese Treaty of 1909.

Personal life
He was the son of Sultan Ahmad Tajuddin Mukarram Shah and Wan Hajar.

The Sultan had several wives and partners; Che Manjelara, Che Sofiah, Sharifah Fatimah Binti Syed Idrus, Sharifah Seha Binti Syed Hussein, Che Spachendra, Sharifah Mariam and Che Laraseh. The Sultan's seventh son and twentieth child with Makche Manjelara, Tunku Abdul Rahman, who would later become the first Prime Minister of Malaysia. The Sultan was succeeded by another son, Sultan Badlishah.

Family
 Children with Che Puan Spachendra (died 1907)
 Tunku Ibrahim 
 Tunku Zam Zam
 Tunku Rokiah 
 Tunku Fatimah 
 Tunku Kassim 

 Children with Che Laraseh binti Lebai Ishak (died 1946)
 Tunku Zainal Rashid 
 Tunku Mansor 
 Tunku Sofiah 
 Tunku Johara
 Tunku Noor 
 Tunku Zaleha 
 Tunku Abdul Jalil 
 Tunku Mohamad Akil 

 Children with Sharifah Mariam binti Syed Mohamad Al-Idrus
 Tunku Ahmad Tajuddin

 Children with Sharifah Seha binti Syed Hussein (died 1922)
 Tunku Abdullah Thani 
 Tunku Pengeran 
 Tunku Balkis 
 Tunku Zahara

 Children with Tunku Nai Sofiah binti Almarhum Tunku Nai Haji Hassan (died 1948)
 Tunku Mohamad
 Tunku Badlishah
 Tunku Hindon

 Children with Paduka Seri Che Menjalara @ Neang Nara Burirak Menjalara Luang Nara Burirak or Nueang Nandanagara (died 1941)
 Tunku Dakiah Manjalara
 Tunku Muhammad Jewa 
 Tunku Abdul Rahman 
 Tunku Baharum 
 Tunku Aminah 
 Tunku Jaafar Shah
 Tunku Baharum
 Tunku Jahara
 Tunku Mohamad Saad
 Tunku Habsah 
 Tunku Kalsom
 Tunku Yusof
 Tunku Zabedah Manjalara

 Children with Sharifah Fatimah binti Syed Idrus (died 1931)
 Tunku Ya'acob 
 Tunku Hajar
 Tunku Yahaya 
 Tunku Abdul Majid
 Tunku Zainal Abidin 
 Tunku Shuib

Honours

Foreign honours
 : 
  Member of the Order of the Crown of Siam (1876)
  Knight Grand Cross of the Order of the Crown of Siam (1890)
  Dushdi Mala Medal (Rajkarn Pandin) (1893)
  Knight Grand Cross of the Order of the White Elephant of Siam (1895)
  Knight Grand Cross of the Order of Chula Chom Klao of Siam (1895)
  Knight Grand Cordon of the Order of Chula Chom Klao of Siam (1908)
 : 
  Knight Commander of the Order of St Michael and St George (KCMG) – Sir (1911)

References

External links

 List of Sultans of Kedah

1864 births
1943 deaths
19th-century Sultans of Kedah
Honorary Knights Commander of the Order of St Michael and St George
Abdul Hamid Halim of Kedah
20th-century Sultans of Kedah